The governor of Kansas is the head of state of Kansas and the commander-in-chief of the state's military forces. The governor has a duty to enforce state laws, and the power to either approve or veto bills passed by the Kansas Legislature, to convene the legislature at any time, and to grant pardons.

Since becoming a state, Kansas has had 48 governors. The state's longest-serving governors were Robert Docking, John W. Carlin, and Bill Graves, each of whom served 8 years (Docking served four two-year terms; Carlin and Graves each served 2 4-year terms). The shortest-serving governor was John McCuish, who served only 11 days after the resignation of Fred Hall.

The current governor is Democrat Laura Kelly, who took office on January 14, 2019.

Governors

Governors of Kansas Territory 
Kansas Territory was organized on May 30, 1854, from land that had previously been part of Missouri Territory. Despite existing only for six years, it had six governors appointed by the President of the United States.

Governors of Kansas 

The eastern bulk of Kansas Territory was admitted to the Union as Kansas on January 29, 1861. The Kansas Constitution provided that a governor and lieutenant governor be elected every 2 years, for a term commencing on the second Monday in the January after the election. An amendment in 1972 increased terms to four years, with a limit that a governor could not serve more than two terms in a row, and provided that the governor and lieutenant governor are elected on the same ticket. In the original constitution, should the office of governor be vacant, the powers would devolve upon the lieutenant governor, who nonetheless would remain in that office; the 1972 amendment changed it so that, in such an event, the lieutenant governor becomes governor.

Until 2018, there was no age or residency requirement to run for the office; in 2017, three teenagers were doing so. In 2018, a law was passed establishing the age to run for governor and lieutenant governor at 25.

See also
 List of Kansas state legislatures
 Gubernatorial lines of succession in the United States#Kansas

Notes

References 
General

 
 
 
 

Constitutions

 Constitution of the State of Kansas (1859), as amended. Retrieved February 28, 2023.
 Constitution of the State of Kansas (1859), original. Retrieved February 28, 2023.

Specific

External links 

 Office of the Governor of Kansas website

Lists of state governors of the United States

Government of Kansas
Governors